Agyneta simplicitarsis is a species of sheet weaver found in Europe, Kazakhstan and Russia. It was described by Simon in 1884.

References

simplicitarsis
Spiders described in 1884
Spiders of Europe
Spiders of Russia
Spiders of Asia